The 2016 Vermont Senate election took place as part of the biennial United States elections. Vermont voters elected State Senators in all 30 seats. State senators serve two-year terms in the Vermont Senate. The election coincided with elections for other offices including the Presidency, U.S. Senate, U.S. House, Governor, and State House. A primary election held on August 9, 2016 determined which candidates appeared on the November 6 general election ballot.

Following the 2014 Senate elections, Democrats maintained control of the Senate with 21 members in the majority caucus (19 Democrats and 2 Progressives). To claim control of the chamber from Democrats, the Republicans would have needed to net gain 6 or 7 seats depending on the winner of the 2016 Vermont lieutenant gubernatorial election, which was Progressive Dave Zuckerman. However, in these elections, the Democrats instead gained 2 seats from the Republicans. After these elections, Joe Benning stepped down as Minority Leader and he was succeeded by Dustin Degree. Tim Ashe was elected as the new President pro tempore to succeed John Campbell, who had retired.

Summary of results

Results summary

Incumbents defeated in the primary election
Norm McAllister (R-Franklin), defeated by Carolyn Whitney Branagan (R)

Incumbents defeated in the general election
Bill Doyle (R-Washington), defeated by Francis Brooks (D)

Open seats that changed parties
Helen Riehle (R-Chittenden) didn't seek re-election, seat won by Debbie Ingram (D)

Detailed results

Addison
Elects 2 senators.
Incumbent Democrats Claire Ayer, who has represented the Addison district since 2003, and Christopher Bray, who has represented the Addison district since 2013, were re-elected.

Bennington
Elects 2 senators.
Incumbent Democrats  Dick Sears, who has represented the Bennington district since 1993, and Brian Campion, who has represented the Bennington district since 2015, were both re-elected.

Caledonia
Incumbent Democrat Jane Kitchel, who has represented the Caledonia district since 2005, and incumbent Republican Minority Leader Joe Benning, who has represented the Caledonia district since 2011, were both re-elected.
Elects 2 senators.

Chittenden
Elects 6 senators.
Incumbent incumbent Democrats Tim Ashe, who has represented the Chittenden district since 2009, Ginny Lyons, who has represented the Chittenden district since 2001, Michael Sirotkin, who has represented the Chittenden district since 2014, and Phil Baruth, who has represented the Chittenden district since 2011, were all re-elected. Incumbent Progressive David Zuckerman, who has represented the Chittenden district since 2013, retired to run for Lieutenant Governor. Incumbent Republican Helen Riehle, who has represented the Chittenden district since 2016,  didn't seek re-election. Progressive Christopher Pearson and Democrat Debbie Ingram won the open seats.

Essex-Orleans
Elects 2 senators.
Incumbent Democrats Robert Starr, who has represented the Essex-Orleans district since 2005, and John Rodgers, who has represented the Essex-Orleans district since 2013, were both re-elected.

Franklin
Elects 2 senators.
Incumbent Republican Dustin Degree, who has represented the Franklin district since 2015, was re-elected. Incumbent Republican Norm McAllister, who has represented the Franklin district since 2013, lost re-nomination to fellow Republican  Carolyn Whitney Branagan. Branagan won the open seat.

Grand Isle
Elects 1 senator.
Incumbent Democrat Richard Mazza, who has represented the Grand Isle district since 1985, was re-elected.

Lamoille
Elects 1 senator.
Incumbent Republican Richard Westman, who has represented the Lamoille district since 2011, was re-elected.

Orange
Elects 1 senator.
Incumbent Democrat Mark MacDonald, who has represented the Orange district since 2003, was re-elected.

Rutland
Elects 3 senators.
Incumbent Republicans Peg Flory, who has represented the Rutland district since 2011, Kevin Mullin, who has represented the Rutland district since 2003, and Brian Collamore, who has represented the Rutland district since 2015, were all re-elected.

Washington
Elects 3 senators.
Incumbent Democrat Ann Cummings, who has represented the Washington district since 1997, and incumbent Progressive Minority Leader Anthony Pollina, who has represented the Washington district since 2011, were both re-elected. Incumbent Republican Bill Doyle, who has represented the Washington district since 1969, lost re-election to Democrat Francis Brooks.

Windham
Elects 2 senators.
Incumbent Democrat Majority Leader Becca Balint, who has represented the Windham district since 2015, and incumbent Democrat Jeanette White, who has represented the Windham district since 2003, were both re-elected.

Windsor
Elects 3 senators.
Incumbent Democrats Alice Nitka, who has represented the windsor district since 2007, and Richard McCormack, who has represented the Windsor district since 2007, were both re-elected. Incumbent Democrat Senate President pro tempore John Campbell, who has represented the Windsor district since 2001, retired. Fellow Democrat Alison Clarkson won the open seat.

See also
2016 United States elections
2016 Vermont elections
2016 United States presidential election in Vermont
2016 United States Senate election in Vermont
2016 United States House of Representatives election in Vermont
2016 Vermont gubernatorial election
2016 Vermont House of Representatives election

References

Senate
Vermont Senate elections
Vermont Senate